Simblaspis is an extinct arthrodire placoderm fish. Its fossils have been found in Pragian strate of the Qasr Limestone in Saudi Arabia.

References 

Arthrodire genera
Pragian life
Fossil taxa described in 1958